Metronidazole, sold under the brand name Flagyl among others, is an antibiotic and antiprotozoal medication. It is used either alone or with other antibiotics to treat pelvic inflammatory disease, endocarditis, and bacterial vaginosis. It is effective for dracunculiasis, giardiasis, trichomoniasis, and amebiasis. It is an option for a first episode of mild-to-moderate Clostridium difficile colitis if vancomycin or fidaxomicin is unavailable. Metronidazole is available by mouth, as a cream, and by injection into a vein.

Common side effects include nausea, a metallic taste, loss of appetite, and headaches. Occasionally seizures or allergies to the medication may occur. Some state that metronidazole should not be used in early pregnancy, while others state doses for trichomoniasis are safe. Metronidazole is generally considered compatible with breastfeeding.

Metronidazole began to be commercially used in 1960 in France. It is on the World Health Organization's List of Essential Medicines. It is available in most areas of the world. In 2020, it was the 222nd most commonly prescribed medication in the United States, with more than 2million prescriptions.

Medical uses

Metronidazole is primarily used to treat: bacterial vaginosis, pelvic inflammatory disease (along with other antibacterials like ceftriaxone), pseudomembranous colitis, aspiration pneumonia, rosacea (topical), fungating wounds (topical), intra-abdominal infections, lung abscess, periodontitis, amoebiasis, oral infections, giardiasis, trichomoniasis, and infections caused by susceptible anaerobic organisms such as Bacteroides, Fusobacterium, Clostridium, Peptostreptococcus, and Prevotella species. It is also often used to eradicate Helicobacter pylori along with other drugs and to prevent infection in people recovering from surgery.

Metronidazole is bitter and so the liquid suspension contains metronidazole benzoate. This may require hydrolysis in the gastrointestinal tract and some sources speculate that it may be unsuitable in people with diarrhea or feeding-tubes in the duodenum or jejunum.

Bacterial vaginosis
Drugs of choice for the treatment of bacterial vaginosis include metronidazole and clindamycin. The treatment of choice for bacterial vaginosis in nonpregnant women include metronidazole oral twice daily for seven days, or metronidazole gel intravaginally once daily for five days, or clindamycin intravaginally at bedtime for seven days. For pregnant women, the treatment of choice is metronidazole oral three times a day for seven days. Data does not report routine treatment of male sexual partners.

Trichomoniasis
The 5-nitroimidazole drugs (metronidazole and tinidazole) are the mainstay of treatment for infection with Trichomonas vaginalis. Treatment for both the infected patient and the patient's sexual partner is recommended, even if asymptomatic. Therapy other than 5-nitroimidazole drugs is also an option, but cure rates are much lower.

Giardiasis
Oral metronidazole is a treatment option for giardiasis, however, the increasing incidence of nitroimidazole resistance is leading to the increased use of other compound classes.

Dracunculus
In the case of Dracunculus medinensis (Guinea worm), metronidazole just eases worm extraction rather than killing the worm.

C. difficile colitis
Initial antibiotic therapy for less-severe Clostridioides difficile infection colitis (pseudomembranous colitis) consists of metronidazole, vancomycin, or fidaxomicin by mouth. In 2017, the IDSA generally recommended vancomycin and fidaxomicin over metronidazole. Vancomycin by mouth has been shown to be more effective in treating people with severe C. difficile colitis.

E. histolytica 
Entamoeba histolytica invasive amebiasis is treated with metronidazole for eradication, in combination with diloxanide to prevent recurrence. Although it is generally a standard treatment it is associated with some side effects.

Preterm births
Metronidazole has also been used in women to prevent preterm birth associated with bacterial vaginosis, amongst other risk factors including the presence of cervicovaginal fetal fibronectin (fFN). Metronidazole was ineffective in preventing preterm delivery in high-risk pregnant women (selected by history and a positive fFN test) and, conversely, the incidence of preterm delivery was found to be higher in women treated with metronidazole.

Hypoxic radiosensitizer
In addition to its anti-biotic properties, attempts were also made to use a possible radiation-sensitizing effect of metronidazole in the context of radiation therapy against hypoxic tumors. However, the neurotoxic side effects occurring at the required dosages have prevented the widespread use of metronidazole as an adjuvant agent in radiation therapy. However, other nitroimidazoles derived from metronidazole such as nimorazole with reduced electron affinity showed less serious neuronal side effects and have found their way into radio-onological practice for head and neck tumors in some countries.

Perioral dermatitis 
Canadian Family Physician has recommended topical metronidazole as a third-line treatment for the perioral dermatitis either along with or without oral tetracycline or oral erythromycin as first and second line treatment respectively.

Adverse effects
Common adverse drug reactions (≥1% of those treated with the drug) associated with systemic metronidazole therapy include: nausea, diarrhea, weight loss, abdominal pain, vomiting, headache, dizziness, and metallic taste in the mouth. Intravenous administration is commonly associated with thrombophlebitis. Infrequent adverse effects include: hypersensitivity reactions (rash, itch, flushing, fever), headache, dizziness, vomiting, glossitis, stomatitis, dark urine, and paraesthesia. High doses and long-term systemic treatment with metronidazole are associated with the development of leucopenia, neutropenia, increased risk of peripheral neuropathy, and central nervous system toxicity. Common adverse drug reaction associated with topical metronidazole therapy include local redness, dryness and skin irritation; and eye watering (if applied near eyes). Metronidazole has been associated with cancer in animal studies. In rare cases, it can also cause temporary hearing loss that reverses after cessation of the treatment.

Some evidence from studies in rats indicates the possibility it may contribute to serotonin syndrome, although no case reports documenting this have been published to date.

Mutagenesis and carcinogenesis

In 2016 metronidazole was listed by the U.S. National Toxicology Program (NTP) as reasonably anticipated to be a human carcinogen. Although some of the testing methods have been questioned, oral exposure has been shown to cause cancer in experimental animals and has also demonstrated some mutagenic effects in bacterial cultures. The relationship between exposure to metronidazole and human cancer is unclear. One study  found an excess in lung cancer among women (even after adjusting for smoking), while other studies  found either no increased risk, or a statistically insignificant risk.
Metronidazole is listed as a possible carcinogen according to the World Health Organization (WHO) International Agency for Research on Cancer (IARC). A study in those with Crohn's disease also found chromosomal abnormalities in circulating lymphocytes in people treated with metronidazole.

Stevens–Johnson syndrome
Metronidazole alone rarely causes Stevens–Johnson syndrome, but is reported to occur at high rates when combined with mebendazole.

Drug interactions

Alcohol

Consuming alcohol while taking metronidazole has been suspected in case reports to cause a disulfiram-like reaction with effects that can include nausea, vomiting, flushing of the skin, tachycardia, and shortness of breath. People are often advised not to drink alcohol during systemic metronidazole therapy and for at least 48 hours after completion of treatment. However, some studies call into question the mechanism of the interaction of alcohol and metronidazole,
and a possible central toxic serotonin reaction for the alcohol intolerance is suggested. Metronidazole is also generally thought to inhibit the liver metabolism of propylene glycol (found in some foods, medicines, and in many electronic cigarette e-liquids), thus propylene glycol may potentially have similar interaction effects with metronidazole.

Other drug interactions
Metronidazole is a moderate CYP2C9 inhibitor. CYP2C9 is an enzyme of cytochrome P450 family. Therefore, metronidazole may interact with medications metabolized by this enzyme. Examples of such medications are lomitapide, warfarin, etc.

Pharmacology

Mechanism of action
Metronidazole is of the nitroimidazole class. It inhibits nucleic acid synthesis by forming nitroso radicals, which disrupt the DNA of microbial cells. This function only occurs when metronidazole is partially reduced, and because this reduction usually happens only in anaerobic bacteria and protozoans, it has relatively little effect upon human cells or aerobic bacteria.

Pharmacokinetics

Oral metronidazole is approximately 80% bioavailable via the gut and peak blood plasma concentrations occur after one to two hours. Food may slow down absorption but does not diminish it. Of the circulating substance, about 20% is bound to plasma proteins. It penetrates well into tissues, the cerebrospinal fluid, the amniotic fluid and breast milk, as well as into abscess cavities.

About 60% of the metronidazole is metabolized by oxidation to the main metabolite hydroxymetronidazole and a carboxylic acid derivative, and by glucuronidation. The metabolites show antibiotic and antiprotozoal activity in vitro. Metronidazole and its metabolites are mainly excreted via the kidneys (77%) and to a lesser extent via the faeces (14%). The biological half-life of metronidazole in healthy adults is eight hours, in infants during the first two months of their lives about 23 hours, and in premature babies up to 100 hours.

The biological activity of hydroxymetronidazole is 30% to 65%, and the elimination half-life is longer than that of the parent compound. The serum half-life of hydroxymetronidazole after suppository was 10 hours, 19 hours after intravenous infusion, and 11 hours after a tablet.

History 
The drug was initially developed by Rhône-Poulenc in the 1950s and licensed to G.D. Searle. Searle was acquired by Pfizer in 2003. The original patent expired in 1982, but evergreening reformulation occurred thereafter.

Brand name 
In India, it is sold under the brand name Metrogyl and Flagyl. In Bangladesh, it is available as Amodis, Amotrex, Dirozyl, Filmet, Flagyl, Flamyd, Metra, Metrodol, Metryl, etc. In Pakistan, it is sold under the brand name of Flagyl and Metrozine.

Synthesis
2-Methylimidazole (1) may be prepared via the Debus-Radziszewski imidazole synthesis, or from ethylenediamine and acetic acid, followed by treatment with lime, then Raney nickel. 2-Methylimidazole is nitrated to give 2-methyl-4(5)-nitroimidazole (2), which is in turn alkylated with ethylene oxide or 2-chloroethanol to give metronidazole (3):

Veterinary use
Metronidazole is used to treat infections of Giardia in dogs, cats, and other companion animals, although it does not reliably clear infection with this organism and is being supplanted by fenbendazole for this purpose in dogs and cats. It is also used for the management of chronic inflammatory bowel disease in cats and dogs. Another common usage is the treatment of systemic and/or gastrointestinal clostridial infections in horses. Metronidazole is used in the aquarium hobby to treat ornamental fish and as a broad-spectrum treatment for bacterial and protozoan infections in reptiles and amphibians. In general, the veterinary community may use metronidazole for any potentially susceptible anaerobic infection. The U.S. Food and Drug Administration (FDA) suggests it only be used when necessary because it has been shown to be carcinogenic in mice and rats, as well as to prevent antimicrobial resistance.

References

External links 
 
 

AbbVie brands
Antiprotozoal agents
Disulfiram-like drugs
Fishkeeping
French inventions
IARC Group 2B carcinogens
Nitroimidazole antibiotics
Pfizer brands
Wikipedia medicine articles ready to translate
Sanofi
World Health Organization essential medicines